Oneok Field is a baseball park in Tulsa, Oklahoma.  Located in the historic Greenwood district adjacent to downtown Tulsa, it is the home of the Tulsa Drillers of the Texas League. The stadium is named for Oneok.

Oneok Field has also been the home of FC Tulsa of the USL Championship since 2015.

Construction

The Drillers, who then played at Drillers Stadium on the Tulsa County Fairgrounds, began looking for a replacement ballpark in about 1998; at one point they signed a non-binding letter of intent to move to the Tulsa suburb of Jenks, before efforts by then-Tulsa mayor Kathy Taylor and others led to the Drillers deciding to proceed with a downtown stadium.  The Drillers announced the move on June 26, 2008.  The future of the stadium was for a time threatened by the financial collapse of its largest donor, SemGroup. However, groundbreaking for the new ballpark went forward on December 19, 2008.  On January 12, 2009, Oneok, Inc. and the Oneok Foundation announced that they would pay $5 million USD to obtain the 20-year naming rights for the new baseball park.

The Drillers played their first game in the new ballpark on Thursday, April 8, 2010, losing 7-0 to the Corpus Christi Hooks before a crowd of 8,665 (more than 800 over official capacity). The first pitch at the stadium was thrown by country music star, Tim McGraw.

Features
Oneok Field was designed by architect firm Populous of Kansas City, Missouri and constructed by Manhattan Construction Company.  The stadium has an official capacity of 7,833, but is capable of holding up to 9,000 for special events. (On May 7, 2010, the stadium had a reported record attendance of 9,417 for a Bedlam Series game between the University of Oklahoma Sooners and the Oklahoma State University Cowboys.)  It has 23 suites and a playing field recessed about 13 feet below street level. With a construction cost of $39.2 million, the project also included the purchase of adjacent land for complementary development, for a total project budget of $60 million.

The new ballpark was intended to be more directly connected to its urban surroundings than was the old stadium at the fairgrounds, and also to have many of the same kinds of luxury amenities available in a major-league ballpark, both for fans and for the players and coaches.

References

External links

ONEOK Field
Tulsa Drillers
ONEOK Field Webcam

Sports venues in Tulsa, Oklahoma
Minor league baseball venues
Baseball venues in Oklahoma
Sports venues completed in 2010
Oneok
2010 establishments in Oklahoma
Soccer venues in Oklahoma
USL Championship stadiums
FC Tulsa
Populous (company) buildings
Texas League ballparks